Jenő Bódi (born 10 August 1963) is a Hungarian wrestler. He competed at the 1988 Summer Olympics and the 1992 Summer Olympics.

References

External links
 

1963 births
Living people
Hungarian male sport wrestlers
Olympic wrestlers of Hungary
Wrestlers at the 1988 Summer Olympics
Wrestlers at the 1992 Summer Olympics
People from Nagykőrös
Sportspeople from Pest County